A Senator is a member of a senate, such as the United States Senate.

Senator or Senators may also refer to:

People
Senator (bishop of Milan) (died 475), also known as Senator of Settala
Senator (consul 436), a politician of the Eastern Roman Empire
Henry of Castile the Senator (1230–1303), Castilian infante; the fourth son of Ferdinand III of Castile by Beatrice of Swabia
"The Senator", nickname for American jazz bassist Eugene Wright, member of The Dave Brubeck Quartet
Hermann Senator (1834–1911), German internist physician
Ronald Senator (1926–2015), British composer

Sport teams
Ottawa Senators, a Canadian hockey team
Washington Senators (1961-1971), a U.S. baseball team in the American League, now the Texas Rangers
Washington Senators (1901–1905 and 1956–1960), a U.S. baseball team in the American League, based in Washington from 1901 to 1960 though officially named the Nationals during 1905–1955, now the Minnesota Twins
Washington Senators (1891-1899), a former U.S. baseball team initially in the American Association and later in the National League
Senators (1946), a Japanese baseball team now known as the Hokkaido Nippon-Ham Fighters
Tokyo Senators (1936-1939), a former Japanese baseball team that was later known under other names and dissolved in 1943

Ships 
 Senator (sternwheeler), Oregon, from 1863 to 1875
 Senator (1848 ship), one of the first ocean-going steamers on the California Coast
 Senator (1898 ship), a Pacific coast steamer that participated in the Nome gold rush
 SS Senator, a Great Lakes freighter sunk in 1929 on Lake Michigan
 Senator Schröder (ship), a German Trawler

Other
Opel Senator, also known as the Chevrolet Senator or Vauxhall Senator
The Senator (play), 1890 play and 1915 silent film
Senator Theatre, in Baltimore, Maryland
The Senator (tree), in Florida
Chappaquiddick (film), known in the UK as The Senator
Lampromicra senator, an Australian species of insect in the family Scutelleridae, commonly known as the green jewel bug
Member of the Supreme Court of Latvia
Roshel Senator, a Canadian armoured personnel carrier

See also

 
 
The Senate (disambiguation)
List of national senates in the world
Hotel Senator (disambiguation)
Washington Senators (disambiguation)
Ottawa Senators (disambiguation)
Sen (disambiguation)